Wilderness is a 1996 British drama directed by Ben Bolt. It is based on a 1991 novel of the same name by Dennis Danvers. The horror series was produced by Red Rooster Film & Television Entertainment in association with Carlton Television for the ITV network.

Plot 
A disturbed young woman (Alice) has trouble convincing her lover that she is a wolf, and her psychiatrist is sure he has discovered a new complex that will make his name. She moves to a retreat in Scotland, where she morphs permanently into a wolf.

Cast 
Amanda Ooms as Alice White
Owen Teale as Dan Somers
Michael Kitchen as Luther Adams
Gemma Jones as Jane Garth
Johanna Benyon as Serena
Molly Bolt as Dan's daughter
Mark Caven as Chuck
Jim Dunk as Butcher
David Gillespie as Maurice
Mary Healey as Nurse
Terence Hillyer as Carl
Catherine Holman as Young Alice
Brigitte Kahn as Alice's mother
Val Lehman as Vet
Nicholas Lumley as Alice's father
Rosalind March as Eleanor
Philip McGough as Marcus
Liz Moscrop as Luther's receptionist
Gerard O'Hare as Kevin
Catherine Russell as Deborah
Nina Thomas as Sarah
Rupert Vansittart as Jeremy
Daniel Wilson as Darren (as James Wilson)

Soundtrack

External links 

1996 British television series debuts
1996 British television series endings
1990s British drama television series
1990s British horror television series
ITV television dramas
British horror fiction television series
Carlton Television
1990s horror novels
1990s British television miniseries
Television shows based on British novels
Television series by ITV Studios
English-language television shows
Television shows set in Scotland
1996 horror films
1996 films